Chiang Rung may refer to:
Jinghong in China
Wiang Chiang Rung District in Thailand

See also
Chiang Hung